During the 2001–02 season, Feyenoord participated in the Eredivisie, the top tier of Dutch football, as well as the KNVB Cup, UEFA Champions League, and the UEFA Cup. They were proclaimed champions of the 2002 UEFA Cup Final after beating Borussia Dortmund (Germany).

Season summary
Feyenoord endured an early exit in the Champions League group stage and consequently was demoted to the UEFA Cup after finishing in third place in Group H. In the continental competition (known as a secondary-level tournament, behind the Champions League), Feyenoord defeated Freiburg, Rangers, PSV, and Inter Milan to reach the final (held at Feyenoord's home ground of Stadion Feijenoord, which is more commonly known by its nickname De Kuip), where they defeated Borussia Dortmund to win their second-ever UEFA Cup.

First-team squad

Transfers

In
  Edwin Zoetebier -  Vitesse Arnhem
  Henk Timmer -  AZ, loan
  Mauricio Aros -  Universidad de Chile
  Leonardo dos Santos -  Groningen
  Shinji Ono -  Urawa Red Diamonds
  Ramon van Haaren -  Roda JC
  Pieter Collen -  N.E.C.

Results

Eredivisie

UEFA Champions League

Group stage

UEFA Cup

Third round

Fourth round

Quarter-final

Semi-final

Final

Top scorers

UEFA Cup
 Pierre van Hooijdonk 8

References

Feyenoord seasons
Feyenoord
UEFA Europa League-winning seasons